Erika Thormahlen is an American writer, producer, actor and child educator. She is best known for her role as Ashley "Ash" Gordon on the NBC comedy-drama Just Deal. She is the co-creator of Waffles + Mochi, a show about food produced by Barack and Michelle Obama's production company, Higher Ground Productions for Netflix.

Career 
Thormahlen was born in Ashland, Oregon. She began modeling at the age of 10. She attended Alameda High School in Alameda, California, and was slated to graduate in 1998 but instead opted for a GED. While studying for her degree in English and creative writing at UCLA, she was cast in the NBC Saturday morning program Just Deal co-starring as Ashley "Ash" Gordon. The show ran for 39 episodes before ending in its run 2002. Within the same year, she guest starred on episode of Angel as well as getting the lead role in the 2005 short film Smile for the Camera.

In 2007, Thormahlen earned a Master's degree in Education in Arts & Humanities at New York University.

Thormahlen also created, wrote and produced a TV pilot for kids focusing on food and nutrition called, What's Cooking with Waffles and Mousemeat. The puppet show also features a human cast including Simon Helberg, Jason Ritter and a guest interview with Maroon 5. The show premiered at the 2006 New York Television Festival.

In 2021, she and Jeremy Konner co-created a version of the original food-focused show with puppets called Waffles + Mochi  on Netflix.

Thormahlen currently lives in New York City and works as a freelance writer, producer and creative consultant, as well as contributor to The Cut  and New York Family magazine.

Filmography

References

External links 

1983 births
Actresses from Oregon
American education writers
American film actresses
American television actresses
Living people
Steinhardt School of Culture, Education, and Human Development alumni
Actresses from New York City
University of California, Los Angeles alumni
Educators from New York City
American women educators
21st-century American women